Govind Singh Thakur is an Indian politician. He was elected to the Himachal Pradesh Legislative Assembly from Manali in the 2007, 2012 and 2017 Himachal Pradesh Legislative Assembly election as a member of the Bharatiya Janata Party. He held the chair as Minister of Forest, Transport, Youth Services and Sports till 31 July 2020, he was Education & Language and Culture Minister in Jai Ram Thakur cabinet.

References

1968 births
Living people
People from Manali, Himachal Pradesh
Himachal Pradesh MLAs 2017–2022
Bharatiya Janata Party politicians from Himachal Pradesh
Himachal Pradesh MLAs 2007–2012
Himachal Pradesh MLAs 2012–2017